Yavornitsa is a village in Petrich Municipality, in Blagoevgrad Province, Bulgaria. The Greek name of village is "Γαβερνίτσα".

References

Villages in Blagoevgrad Province